Antônio Carlos Guimarães (born 12 April 1973), known as Tuca Guimarães, is a Brazilian football manager, currently in charge of Patrocinense.

Starting his career in futsal, Tuca moved to football in 2010 with São Paulo's youth setup. In 2016, he managed Série A club Figueirense for eight matches.

Honours

Futsal
Deporcentro Casuarinas
Peruvian Futsal Championship: 2003

Banespa
Campeonato Paulista: 2004, 2005, 2006

Garça/Banespa
Liga Sudeste: 2007
Copa dos Campeões: 2008

Cortiana Futsal
Copa Gramado: 2010

Manager
Nacional-SP
Campeonato Paulista Série A3: 2017

References

External links

1973 births
Living people
Sportspeople from São Paulo
Brazilian football managers
Campeonato Brasileiro Série A managers
Campeonato Brasileiro Série B managers
Marília Atlético Clube managers
Comercial Futebol Clube (Ribeirão Preto) managers
São José Esporte Clube managers
Nacional Atlético Clube (SP) managers
Clube Atlético Sorocaba managers
Figueirense FC managers
Associação Portuguesa de Desportos managers
Esporte Clube Noroeste managers
Boa Esporte Clube managers
Treze Futebol Clube managers
Uberlândia Esporte Clube managers
Clube Atlético Juventus managers
Atlético Monte Azul managers
21st-century Brazilian people